Armoured Troops are the corps in the Ukrainian Ground Forces, the main striking force of ground troops. They are used primarily in conjunction with mechanized forces in key areas and perform the following tasks:

 in defense - support of mechanized troops in repelling the enemy attack and developing counterattacks;
 in the attack - the application of powerful strokes to dissect enemy lines in greater depth, development of success, and defeat the enemy in counter-battles and battles.

Duties and tasks 
The basis of the Armoured Forces are tank brigades and tank battalions of the infantry brigades (mechanized, light infantry and mountain), which have great resistance to the striking factors of both conventional and nuclear weapons, firepower, high mobility and maneuverability. They are able to make the most complete use of the results of fire (nuclear) damage to the enemy and in a short time to achieve the final goals of combat operations. 

The combat capabilities of tank formations allow them to conduct active combat operations day and night, at a considerable distance from other troops, to crush the enemy in counter-attacks and battles, to overcome large areas of radioactive contamination on the move, crossing water obstacles, and also to quickly create a strong defense and successfully resist the onslaught of overwhelming enemy forces.

Current Structure
 1st Tank Brigade, Honcharivske, Chernihiv Oblast
 3rd Tank Brigade (Reserve), formed 2016
 4th Tank Brigade (Reserve), formed 2017
 5th Tank Brigade (Reserve), formed 2016 
 17th Tank Brigade, Kryvyi Rih, Dnipropetrovsk Oblast
 12th Tank Battalion, Honcharivske, Chernihiv Oblast
 14th Tank Brigade (Reserve), formed 2015 (possibly inactive)

Disbanded Formations
17th Guards Tank Division reformed as 17th Tank Brigade in 2003 
23rd Training Tank Division, disbanded and the 6065th Storage Base since 1987
30th Guards Tank Division reformed first as 30th Tank Brigade and then reformed as 30th Mechanised Brigade in 2004
41st Guards Tank Division, disbanded and the 5193rd Storage Base since 1989
42nd Guards Tank Division, disbanded and the 5359th Storage Base since 1990
48th Guards Tank Training Division, reformed as 169th District Training Centre
117th Guards Tank Division, reformed as 119th District Training Centre

Equipment 
 M55S, T-62, T-64, T-72, PT-91 Twardy, T-80, T-84, Leopard 1, Leopard 2, M1 Abrams, T-90, M-84 main battle tanks in armored battalions
 AMX-10 RC wheeled light tanks/armored reconnaissance vehicles in armored battalions
 BMP-1, BMP-2, BVP M-80, AIFV, M2 Bradley and Marder IFV tracked infantry fighting vehicles in tracked mechanized infantry battalions
 BTR-3, BTR-4 wheeled infantry fighting vehicles in wheeled mechanized infantry battalions
 BTR-60, BTR-70, BTR-80, VAB, M1117, TAB-71M, Patria Pasi wheeled armored personnel carriers in wheeled mechanized infantry battalions
 MT-LB, GT-MU, M113, FV432, FV430 Bulldog tracked armored personnel carriers in tracked mechanized infantry battalions
 BRDM-2, Fennek armored scout cars, some on tank destroyer configuration
 MT-LB-12 (TD) tracked tank destroyers

References

Additional reading 
 Feskov – V.I. Feskov, K.A. Kalashnikov, V.I. Golikov, The Soviet Army in the Years of the Cold War 1945–91, Tomsk University Publishing House, Tomsk, 2004
 Lenskiy – А. Г. Ленский, Сухопутные силы РККА в предвоенные годы. Справочник. — Санкт-Петербург Б&К, 2000

Army units and formations of Ukraine